The qualification group 2 for the 2010 European Men's Handball Championship includes the national teams of Bosnia and Herzegovina, Italy, Faroe Islands, Russia, Serbia and Switzerland.

Standings

Fixtures and results

References
 EHF Euro Events – Men's EURO 2010 (qualification)

Qualification, Group 2